Ophiolysin (Ophiophagus metalloendopeptidase) is an enzyme. This enzyme catalyses the following chemical reaction

 Cleavage of Asn3-Gln, Gln4-His, His10-Leu, Ala14-Leu, and Tyr16-Leu in insulin B chain

This endopeptidase is present in the venom of the king cobra (Ophiophagus hannah)

References

External links 
 

EC 3.4.24